This article is about the phonology of Levantine Arabic also known as Shāmi Arabic, and its sub-dialects.

Varieties
As in most Arabic-speaking areas, the spoken language differs significantly between urban, rural and nomad populations. 
 In the Levant, nomads trace to various tribes of the Arabian Peninsula, and their dialect is consequently close to Peninsular Arabic (Najdi). Note that although claiming a Bedouin ancestry sounds prestigiousin the Levant, the Bedouin influence on this old sedentary area should not be overestimated. These dialects are not covered in detail here, as they are not specific to the area.
 The urban language spoken in the major cities is remarkably homogeneous, with a few shibboleths (markers) only to distinguish the various cities (see below). Levantine Arabic is commonly understood to be this urban sub-variety. Teaching manuals for foreigners provide a systematic introduction to this sub-variety, as it would sound very strange for a foreigner to speak a marked rural dialect, immediately raising questions on unexpected family links, for instance.

Urban Levantine Arabic 
As mentioned above, the urban varieties are remarkably homogeneous throughout the whole area, compared to the changes the language undergo in rural populations. This homogeneity is probably inherited from the trading network among cities in the Ottoman Empire. It may also represent an older state of affairs. As a matter of facts, there is a current trend to diverge from this unity, the language of the cities taking on some of the features of their neighboring villages (e.g. The table below shows the main historical variants which have shibboleth role, most of the rest of the language remaining the same.

Rural subdialects 
Rural Levantine Arabic can be divided into two groups of mutually intelligible subdialects. Again, these dialect considerations have to be understood to apply mainly to rural populations, as the urban forms change much less.

 Northern Levantine Arabic, spoken in Lebanon, Northern Israel and Syria (except the Hauran area south of Damascus). It is characterized by:
This tendency is stronger as one goes northward. ('rain') is pronounced  . This feature may be used to distinguish Central from Northern Levantine.
This feature may be used to distinguish northwest (coastal, Nusayriyyah) from northeast (e.g.
 The characteristic vowel of the imperative is long:  > .

 South Levantine Arabic, spoken in Israel and the Palestinian territories between Nazareth and Bethlehem, in the Syrian Hauran mountains, and in western Jordan.
This latter feature resembles the North Arabian Bedouin dialects.

In Israel, apart from Galilee and the Negev, rural dialects are almost extinct, and this description gives is the pre-1948 state of affairs. Palestinian refugees in Jordan have brought with them their typical features, although they tend to adopt the emerging Jordanian urban speech.

To these typical, widespread subdialects, one could add marginal varieties such as:
 Outer South Levantine, spoken in the Gaza–Beersheva area in Israel and the Palestinian territories, as well as in cities east of the Dead Sea in Jordan (Karak, Tafilah), which display different Bedouin influences as compared to south Levantine. This reflects Hijazi or Sinai Bedouin Arabic pronunciation rather than that of North Arabian Bedouin dialects.
 Bedouin dialects proper, which on top of the above-mentioned features that influence the sedentary dialects, present typical stress patterns (e.g. gahawa syndrome) or lexical items.

Linguistic description

Phonetics

Consonants

The table below shows the correspondence between Modern Standard Arabic (MSA) phonemes, and their counterpart realization in Levantine Arabic. The Urban speech is taken as reference, the variations are given relative to it.

NB. Hamza has a special treatment: at the end of a closed syllable, it vanishes and lengthens the preceding vowel, e.g.  >  (see compensatory lengthening). These evolutions plead for a Hijazi origin of Levantine Arabic.

Vowels and diphthongs 

The table below shows the correspondence between Modern Standard Arabic (MSA) phonemes and their counterpart realization in Levantine Arabic.

Levantine Arabic vowels can be represented in the Arabic script in many ways because of etymological and grammatical reasons, e.g.   ('today').

In French borrowings, nasal vowels //, //, // and // occur:  ("lift"),  "mobile phone".

References

Phonology
Arabic phonology
Language comparison